{{Infobox racing driver
| name              = Graham Hathaway
| image             = 
| image_size        = 
| caption           = 
| nationality       =  British
| birth_date        = 1951
| birth_place       = Chelmsford, Essex, England
| death_date        = 
| death_place       = 
| retired           = 
| related to        = 
| last series       = British Saloon / Touring Car Championship
| years active      = 4
| teams             = Terry Drury RacingSoans Ford Main DealerGraham Hathaway RacingTrakstar Motorsport
| starts            = 20
| wins              = 0 (1 in class)
| poles             = 0
| fastest laps      = 1
| best finish       = 19th
| year              = 1990
| prev series       = 
| prev series years = 
| titles            = 
| title years       = 
| awards            = 
| award years       = 
}}

Graham Hathaway (born April 1951 in Chelmsford, Essex) is a British retired auto racing driver. He is now running his own team Graham Hathaway Racing (GHR). His racing career has seen him compete in rallycross and saloon cars. In 1988, 1989 and 1990 he entered selected rounds of the British Touring Car Championship driving a Ford Sierra RS500.

Graham Hathaway Racing
Robb Gravett won the BTCC privateers cup in 1997 for GHR with a Honda Accord. The team returned to the BTCC, when GHR ran a former Team Dynamics Honda Integra for Simon Blanckley under the Sibsport banner. More recently the team has entered cars in Historic Touring cars and 750 MC bike racing.

Guinness World Speed records achieved for Fastest Production Car    0-60 3.07sec, 0-100 7.06sec, 0-100-0 12.6secs, which stood up until 2006

Racing record

Complete British Touring Car Championship results
(key) (Races in bold indicate pole position) (Races in italics'' indicate fastest lap – 1 point awarded ?–1989 in class)

† Guest driver - not eligible for points.

‡ Endurance driver – not eligible for points

References

External links
GHR official site

1951 births
Living people
English racing drivers
British Touring Car Championship drivers
Sportspeople from Chelmsford